Mohammad Zobeir Niknafs (born April 12, 1993), known as Zobeir Niknafs, is an Iranian football midfielder. He currently plays for Esteghlal in Iran Pro League.

Honours

Foolad 
Hazfi Cup: 2020–21

Esteghlal 
Iran Pro League: 2021–22
Iranian Super Cup: 2022

References

 Mohammad Zobeir Niknafs - Azadegan League 2013-14 Group B at PersianLeague.com
 Mohammad Zobeir Niknafs - Sanat Naft - IPL 2016-2017 at IranProLeague.net

1993 births
Living people
Iranian footballers
Association football defenders
Association football wingers
Sanat Naft Abadan F.C. players
Zob Ahan Esfahan F.C. players
Foolad FC players
Esteghlal F.C. players
People from Sanandaj